Heinrich Münzberger (born 10 June 1946) is an Austrian sports shooter. He competed in the mixed trap event at the 1980 Summer Olympics.

References

1946 births
Living people
Austrian male sport shooters
Olympic shooters of Austria
Shooters at the 1980 Summer Olympics
Sportspeople from Vienna
20th-century Austrian people